Gerald J. Ford Stadium is a stadium in University Park, Texas, with a Dallas mailing address. The stadium is owned by Southern Methodist University (SMU) and used primarily for games played by the SMU Mustangs football team.

About Ford Stadium
The stadium is named after Gerald J. Ford, a billionaire banker who provided most of the funding for its construction.

Outside the northeast corner of the stadium is Doak Walker Plaza, honoring the former Heisman Trophy winner and SMU's greatest football star. The plaza includes a life-sized replica of the Doak Walker Award trophy, awarded annually to the nation's top college football running back. The northwest corner is connected to the Loyd All-Sports Center, which contains locker, training, and office space for SMU athletics, as well as the Spirit Shop, the office of the Alumni Association, and the Athlete Education Center.

History
The building stands on the site of the former Ownby Stadium, the school's previous on-campus football stadium. Ownby was demolished starting in late October 1998 in order to clear the land designated for the new stadium. Ford Stadium opened on September 2, 2000 with a football game against the University of Kansas.

On September 24, 2010, the regular season attendance record was set at Gerald J. Ford Stadium when 35,481 people watched the TCU Horned Frogs face off against the SMU Mustangs in the Battle for the Iron Skillet. TCU won the game and the Iron Skillet 41–24. The overall attendance record is set at 36,742 for the 2010 Armed Forces Bowl between SMU and the Army Black Knights.

Future expansion
The north-south oriented stadium is bowl-shaped, with stands on three sides (west, east, and north). The stadium is expandable to 45,000 seats by enclosing the horseshoe on the south end.

Renovations
In 2012, SMU Mustang Athletics announced the construction of additional luxury suites, as well as the upgrading of infrastructure to the Paul B. Loyd, Jr. All-Sports Center to allow access to designated outdoor seating areas in the stadium. Construction was completed prior to the start of the 2013 season.

On July 26, 2016, SMU officials announced plans for an upcoming facilities project that will include a new indoor performance center for the Mustangs football team, as well as an outdoor natural grass football practice field. The additions are part of the initial phase of SMU's $150 million comprehensive facilities upgrade. 

On December 2, 2022, SMU broke ground on the Gary Weber Endzone Complex, a new, $100 million dollar state-of-the-art facility for the school's football team. The complex, named after Gary Weber, an accomplished entrepreneur, investor, philanthropist and former SMU football player, will include a new weight room, training facilities, meeting rooms, and offices for the football program. The complex is expected to be completed in time for the start of 2024 football season.

Attendance records

Gallery

See also
 List of NCAA Division I FBS football stadiums

References

External links

 

Ford
Sports venues in Dallas
American football venues in the Dallas–Fort Worth metroplex
High school football venues in Texas
2000 establishments in Texas
Sports venues completed in 2000